Gliese 536 b also known as GJ 536 b is a nearby Super-Earth sized exoplanet orbiting interior to the circumstellar habitable zone of the red dwarf (M1) star Gliese 536 every 8.7 days. Due to its short orbital period it could help with future studies of biological activity on exoplanets.

This exoplanet is given the title Super-Earth due to its immense size which is more than five times greater than the Earth. Like many other rocky exoplanets, Gliese 536 b should be part of a large planetary group. Astronomers are still in search of other planets that are in orbit of star Gliese 536. But this planet is hotter than Venus, and although the planet is hotter than it, it may be similar to Venus.

References

Exoplanets detected by radial velocity
Exoplanets discovered in 2016
5
Virgo (constellation)